The Trade Union International of Agricultural, Forestry and Plantation Workers was a trade union international affiliated with the World Federation of Trade Unions.

History 
The TUI was founded at a conference in Warsaw, Poland in December 1949. Its original name was the Trade Union International of Agricultural and Forestry Workers.

In 1997 the Trade Union International of Agroalimentary, Food, Commerce, Textile & Allied Industries was formed by the merger of the Trade Union International of Agricultural, Forestry and Plantation Workers, Trade Union International of Food, Tobacco, Hotel and Allied Industries Workers, Trade Union International of Workers in Commerce, Trade Union International of Textile, Leather and Fur Workers Unions.

Organization 
By 1985 the TUI had branch commissions representing workers in agriculture, plantations, the forestry industry and peasant workers.

In 1955 the headquarters of the organization was located at 19 Via Boncampagni, Rome. In 1985 its address was reported as Opletalova 57 Prague 1, Czechoslovakia. However, by 1989 it had moved to Serpoukhovkaia 44, 113093 Moscow were it stayed until at least 1991.

Conferences 
1st Warsaw, December 1949 - attended by delegates from the Soviet Union, China, East Germany, Italy, Bulgaria, Czechoslovakia, Hungary, Poland and Romania representing 6.57 million members. Unions in Brazil, Albania, North Korea and Tunisia also affiliated.
2nd, 1951 - attended by 205 delegates and observers (66 from Latin America) representing 146 national and regional organizations.
7th Moscow, 1975
9th Warsaw, October 3–6, 1983 - 110 organizations from 71 countries (members and observers) representing 73 million workers attended.

Members 
The following groups were affiliated with the TUI in 1978.

 - Union Professionelle des Travailleurs de l'Agriculture, et des Forets
 - União dos Trabalhadores Angolanos
 - Union de Productores Agropecuarios de Republica Argentina
 - Chittagong Tea Garden Workers Union
 - Fédération Nationale des Syndicats des Travailleurs de la Production Vegetale et Animale de Benin
 - Unión Nacional de Campesinos
 -  Syndicat des Travailleurs de l'Agriculture et des Industrie Alimentaire
 - Confederación Nacional Campesina e Indigena de Chile - RANQUIL
 - National Committee of the Chinese Agricultural, Forestry and Water Conservancy Workers' Union
 - FENSA
 - Fédération Syndicale des Travailleurs de l'Agriculture et des Forets - FESYTRAF
 - Federación Nacional de Trabajadores de Plantaciones
 - Sindicato Nacional de Trabajadores Forestales
 - Cyprus Agricultural, Forestry General Workers' Trade Union
 - Fédération des Travailleurs de l'Agriculture
 - Federación Ecuatoriana de Indios
 - Asociación de Trabajadores Agropecuarios de El Salvador - ATACES
 - Federation of Agricultural and Forestry Workers - CGT
 - Confédération générale du travail de Guadeloupe
 - CGT- Reunion
 - Union of Land, Food and Forests
 - General Agricultural Workers' Union of the Trade Union Congress
 - Guyana Agricultural and General Workers' Union
 - Fédération des Travailleurs Agricoles et Forestiers
 - Bharatiya Khet Mazdoor Union
 - All India Agricultural Workers Union
 - General Union of Agricultural Workers
 - National Federation of Italian Agricultural Labourers and Employees
 - General Union of Agricultural Forestry and Plantation Workers of Jordan
 - Union des Travailleurs Agricoles de Corree 
 - Fedération des Syndicats des Travailleurs de Madagascar - FISEMA
 - Agricultural Workers Union
 - Central Independiente de Oberos Agricolas y Campesinos de Mexico
 - Comite Central du Syndicat des Travailleurs de l'Agriculture
 - Nepal Beekeepers' Association
 - Confederación de Campesinos y de Trabajodores de Nicaragua
 - Federation of Agricultural Workers' Union of Nigeria
 - General Union of Palestinian Peasants
 - Fedération des Syndicats des Travailleurs Agricoles
 - Union des Syndicats des Enterprises et Institutes Agricoles
 - Transport Agricultural and General Workers' Union
 - Syndicat des Travailleurs de l'Agriculture
 - United Plantation Workers' Union
 - Union Generale des Paysans
 - SYNASCOT
 - Syndicat National de Travaileurs de Forets de Vietnam
 - Trade Union of Agricultural Workers

Leadership

General Secretaries
1949: Ilio Bosi
1960: Vincenzo Galetti
1964: Umberto Fornari
1968: Claude Billault
1980: Gerard Laugier
1980s: René Digne
1980s: André Hemmerle

Presidents
1949: Suleiman Tjugito
1966: Giaochino Chisio
Andreas Kyriakou

See also 
Krestintern

References 

Agricultural
Trade unions established in 1949
Trade unions disestablished in 1997
Organizations based in Prague
1949 establishments in Poland
Agriculture and forestry trade unions
Defunct transnational trade unions
Timber industry trade unions